The Vale of Conwy Football League (also known as the Vale of Conway Football League) was a football league in North Wales. It was formed in 1922 and ceased operating at the end of the 2001–02 season.

History
The league was formed in 1922 and ran for three seasons before disappearing from newspaper coverage.  It restarted for the 1929–30 season and ran until the end of the 2001–02 season, with the exception of the period of the Second World War, when football competitions were suspended.

League champions

1920s

1922–23: – Penmaenmawr reserves
1923–24: – Penmaen Celts
1924–25: – Dolgarrog United
1929–30: – Conway Casuals

1930s

1930–31: – Craigydon
1931–32: – Craigydon
1932–33: – Penrhyn United
1933–34: – Penrhyn United
1934–35: – Llanrwst Town
1935–36: – Conwy Borough
1936–37: – Llanrwst Town
1937–38: – Llanrwst Town
1938–39: – Penmaenmawr
1939–40: – Penmaenmawr

1940s

1940–41: – Competition suspended - World War Two
1941–42: – Competition suspended - World War Two
1942–43: – Competition suspended - World War Two
1943–44: – Competition suspended - World War Two
1944–45: – Competition suspended - World War Two
1945–46: – Llanddulas
1946–47: – Conway
1947–48: – Llanrwst Town
1948–49: – Machno United
1949–50 – Machno United

1950s

1950–51: – Conway Casuals
1951–52: – Llandudno reserves
1952–53: – Trefriw Spa
1953–54: – Conway Casuals
1954–55: – Llandudno VC
1955–56: – Trefriw Spa
1956–57: – Gwydyr Rovers
1957–58: – Gwydyr Rovers
1958–59: – Mochdre Youth
1959–60: – Gwydyr Rovers

1960s

1960–61 – Machno United
1961–62 – Dolwyddelan
1962–63 – Dolwyddelan
1963–64 – Colwyn Bay reserves
1964–65 – Colwyn Bay reserves
1965–66 – Llandudno reserves
1966–67  – Machno United
1967–68 – Machno United
1968–69 – Machno United
1969–70 – Llandudno Amateurs

1970s

1970–71 –  Dolwyddelan
1971–72 – Machno United
1972–73 – Machno United
1973–74 – Machno United
1974–75 –  Llandudno Amateurs
1975–76 –  Llandudno Amateurs
1976–77 –  Mochdre
1977–78 –  Llandudno Amateurs
1978–79 –  Llandudno Amateurs
1979–80 –  Cerrigydrudion

1980s

1980–81 – Llanrwst Town
1981–82 – Rhos United
1982–83 – Llanrwst Town
1983–84 – Mochdre
1984–85 – Mochdre
1985–86 – Machno United
1986–87 – Hotpoint SC Llandudno Junction
1987–88 – Blaenau Amateurs
1988–89 – Llanfairfechan Town
1989–90 – Penmaenmawr Phoenix

1990s

1990–91 – Colwyn Bay reserves
1991–92 – Machno United
1992–93 – Mochdre
1993–94 – CPD Bro Cernyw
1994–95 – Machno United
1995–96 – Llandudno reserves
1996–97 – Llansannan
1997–98 – Glan Conway
1998–99 – Blaenau Amateurs
1999–2000 – Betws y Coed

2000s

2000–01 – CPD Bro Cernyw
2001–02 – Llanfairfechan Town

References

1922 establishments in Wales
Sports leagues established in 1922
Sports leagues disestablished in 2002
2002 disestablishments in Wales
Defunct football competitions in Wales